William K. Downey (November 11, 1923 – September 5, 2015) was an American professional basketball player.

He played for the Providence Steamrollers of the Basketball Association of America for three games during the 1947–48 season. Downey played at the collegiate level with what are now the Marquette Golden Eagles, and also played basketball with Naval Station Great Lakes.

BAA career statistics

Regular season

References

External links

1923 births
2015 deaths
Centers (basketball)
Marquette Golden Eagles men's basketball players
Providence Steamrollers players
United States Navy sailors
American men's basketball players